The 1997–98 season was the 94th season in the history of FC Schalke 04 and the club's seventh consecutive season in the top flight of German football.

Competitions

Overall record

Bundesliga

League table

Results by round

Matches

Source:

DFB-Pokal

UEFA Cup

References

FC Schalke 04 seasons
FC Schalke 04